The 14th Assembly District of Wisconsin is one of 99 districts in the Wisconsin State Assembly. Located in southeast Wisconsin, the district comprises parts of western Milwaukee County.  It includes most of the city of Wauwatosa and about half of West Allis.  The district is represented by Democrat Robyn Vining, since January 2019.

The 14th Assembly district is located within Wisconsin's 5th Senate district, along with the 13th and 15th Assembly districts.

History 

The district was created in the 1972 redistricting act (1971 Wisc. Act 304) which first established the numbered district system, replacing the previous system which allocated districts to specific counties.  The 14th district was drawn mostly in line with the previous Milwaukee County 9th district, but removed all wards of the city of Glendale and added more wards from the city of Milwaukee, from what had previously been the Milwaukee County 18th district.

The district has remained in the same vicinity, but has crept south and west in redistrictings since 1972.  The 2002 court-ordered redistricting was the first to extend the district into Waukesha County, when the district was drawn to comprise the eastern half of the city of Brookfield with the village of Elm Grove, in Waukesha County, along with the western half of the city of Wauwatosa and western wards of the cities of West Allis and Milwaukee, in Milwaukee County.  The 2022 redistricting sought to cram more Democratic votes into this district in order to make the 13th Assembly district a more safely Republican seat, so all the Waukesha County wards were removed in favor of more of Milwaukee County.

Notable past representatives of the 14th Assembly district include Tom Barrett, the 44th mayor of Milwaukee, who also served in the United States House of Representatives, representing Wisconsin's 5th congressional district for five terms, and Scott Walker, who became the 45th governor of Wisconsin and was a candidate for President in the 2016 Republican Party presidential primaries.

List of past representatives

References 

Wisconsin State Assembly districts
Milwaukee County, Wisconsin
Waukesha County, Wisconsin